AD 59 (LIX) was a common year starting on Monday (link will display the full calendar) of the Julian calendar. At the time, it was known as the Year of the Consulship of Apronianus and Capito (or, less frequently, year 812 Ab urbe condita). The denomination AD 59 for this year has been used since the early medieval period, when the Anno Domini calendar era became the prevalent method in Europe for naming years.

Events

By place

Roman Empire 
 March 23 – Emperor Nero orders the murder of his mother Agrippina the Younger. He tries to kill her through a planned shipwreck, but when she survives, he has her executed and frames it as a suicide.  
 Gnaeus Domitius Corbulo, Roman commander in the east, captures Tigranocerta in Mesopotamia. He installs Tigranes VI, a Cappadocian prince, as ruler of Armenia. For the next four years, a cohort from Legio VI Ferrata and Legio X Fretensis is stationed in the capital as bodyguard to the king, supported by fifteen hundred auxiliaries.  
 Publius Clodius Thrasea Paetus retires from the Roman Senate. He openly shows his disgust at the behaviour of Nero regarding the murder of Agrippina.
 Rioting breaks out between the people of Pompeii and the people of Nuceria during a gladiator fight in Pompeii. Thousands are killed.

By topic

Arts and sciences 
 In the Satyricon, Petronius pokes fun at Roman immorality.
 An eclipse on 30 April over North Africa is recorded by Pliny the Elder in his Natural History.

Religion 
  Paul the Apostle pleads his case and testifies to his Christianity before King Agrippa II of the Herodians, who responds "You almost persuade me to be a Christian."

Deaths 
 March 23 – Agrippina the Younger, mother of Nero (b. AD 15)
 Domitia Lepida the Elder, granddaughter of Mark Antony
 Gnaeus Domitius Afer, Roman politician and orator
 Servilius Nonianus, Roman consul and historian

References 

0059

als:50er#59